NHU, Nhu or Như may refer to

People
  (1910–1963), chief political advisor to his brother, president of South Vietnam
  (born 1980), Vietnamese singer, born 
  (actress) (born 1954), Vietnamese actress, born 
  (singer) (born 1970), Vietnamese singer, born

Places
 Nanhua University (founded 1996), Taiwanese university
 , commune and village in  Province, northern Vietnam
  District, district of  Province, central Vietnam
  District, district of  Province, central Vietnam

Other
 BBC Natural History Unit, factual programming department of the BBC
 Cuong Nhu (founded 1965), martial arts school founded by